The National Election Committee (NEC;) is an independent agency that supervises the national elections of Cambodia. 

Its official motto is "Independence, Neutrality, Truthfulness, Justice and Transparency".

Members

Criticism
The opposition Cambodian National Rescue Party (CNRP) accused the NEC of committing corruption and affiliated with the ruling Cambodian People's Party. In November 2017, Kuoy Bunroeun, Rong Chhun and Te Manirong of the NEC resigned in protest against the dissolution of the CNRP and the reassignment of its parliamentary seats to minor parties.

References

External links 

Elections in Cambodia